Tina Pica (31 March 1884 – 15 August 1968) was an Italian supporting actress who played character roles on stage. Her film debut came in 1935 with The Three-Cornered Hat.

In the 1950s, she became a celebrity thanks to her role as Caramella in the successful film series Bread, Love and Dreams (1953), Bread, Love and Jealousy (1954), Scandal in Sorrento (1955), Bread, Love and Andalusia (1958) and the last one,  (which was never filmed).

In 1955, she won the Nastro d'Argento for Best Supporting Actress.

Partial filmography

  (1916)
  (1916)
 The Three-Cornered Hat (1935) as Assunta, a commoner (uncredited)
 Hands Off Me! (1937) as Giulia, the housemaid
 A Lady Did It (1938) as Teresa, the doorkeeper
 The Marquis of Ruvolito (1939) as Miss Mangialardo
 No Man's Land (1939) as Maruzza
 Lost in the Dark (1947)
 Hey Boy (1948) as Maddalena, the cook
  (1950)
 Filumena Marturano (1951) as Rosalia Solimena
  (1951)
  (1951) as Donna Rosa
 Destiny (1951) as Nunziata
  (1952)
  (1952) as Mrs. De Giorgi
 The City Stands Trial (1952) as the restaurant owner
 Deceit (1952) as an ill old lady
  (1952)
 Husband and Wife (1952) as Rosalia / zia Fedora
 Bread, Love and Dreams (1953) as Caramella
 Naples Sings (1953)
  (1953)
 Melody of Love (1954) as Concetta
 Neapolitan Carousel (1954) as Capera
  (1954) as Semmentella
 Bread, Love and Jealousy (1954) as Caramella
 Naples Is Always Naples (1954) as Donna Bettina 
 The Gold of Naples (1954) as an old lady (segment "")
  (1954) as aunt Rachele
  (1955) as aunt Vittoria
 Graziella (1955) as grandma Assunta
 Toto and Carolina (1955) as the lady at the hospital (uncredited)
 The Sign of Venus (1955) as aunt Tina
  (1955) as Antonia
 A Hero of Our Times (1955) as Clotilde
  (1955) as Beretta's wife
  (1955) as Sibilla
 Destination Piovarolo (1955) as Beppa
 Scandal in Sorrento (1955) as Caramella
  (1955) as Antonietta
  (1955) as aunt Tina
 Tragic Ballad (1955) as the boatswain's wife
  (1956) as Donna Concetta Spestacano
 The Virtuous Bigamist (1956) as aunt Camilla
  (1956) as Tina
  (1956)
  (1956) as Tecla Camarano
  (1957) as grandma Sabella
 Count Max (1957) as the aunt
  (1957) as grandma Matilde
 Lazzarella (1957) as Mrs. Capuano
  (1957) as Tecla Cammarano
  (1958) as Teresa
  (1958) as the grandmother
  (1958)
  (1958) as Nini Bijou
  (1958) as Tina De Cupis
  (1959) as Annunziata
  (1959) as Mrs. Cuccar
  (1959) as aunt Carmela, duchess of Santa Lucia
  (1959) as Donna Sabella
  (1959) as Adelaide Harold
  (1960) as Carmela Esposito
  (1961)
 Yesterday, Today and Tomorrow (1963) as grandma Ferrario (segment "Mara") (final film role)

References

External links
 

1884 births
1968 deaths
Italian stage actresses
Italian film actresses
Italian silent film actresses
Actresses from Naples
Nastro d'Argento winners
20th-century Italian actresses